Happiness Emporium is a Barbershop quartet that won the 1975 SPEBSQSA international competition.

Discography

 Right from the Start (CD)
 Rise 'n Shine (LP, CD)
 Now & Then (LP, CD)
 Oh Lord, It's Hard to Be Humble (CD)
 Control Yourself (LP, CD)
 That's Entertainment! (LP, cassette, CD)
 That's Life! (cassette, CD)
 Beneath the Cross (cassette, CD)
 Beneath the Cross II (CD)
 Golden Gospel (CD)
 Golden Gospel II (CD)
 Double Feature (DVD)
 Time Flies (CD)

External links 
 AIC entry (archived)

References 

Barbershop quartets
Barbershop Harmony Society